Venancio Bartibás (18 May 1906 – July 1977) was a Uruguayan footballer who played as a defender. He played one match for the Uruguay national team in 1927. He was an unused member of Uruguay team which won gold medal at 1928 Olympics.

References

External links

1906 births
1977 deaths
Uruguayan footballers
Uruguay international footballers
Footballers from Montevideo
Association football defenders
Central Español players